This is the list of Ganesha temples. In southern India, the temples are also popularly known as  Pillaiyar temples or Vinayaka temples, by the alternate popular names of the Hindu god Ganesha in those regions.

India

Ashtavinayaka

Notable

Outside India

References

External links 

Ganesha